Polyporic acid is a para-terphenyl benzoquinone compound first identified by German chemist Stahlschmidt from a mycelial culture of the fungus species Hapalopilus nidulans in 1877. This chemical, present at 20–40% of the fresh weight of the fruit bodies, inhibits the enzyme dihydroorotate dehydrogenase. It is found in other mushrooms, but in much lower amounts.

In animal studies, consumption of polyporic acid caused reduced locomotor activity, depressed visual placing response, hepatorenal failure, metabolic acidosis, hypokalaemia, and hypocalcaemia.  Because these effects are similar to those observed in individuals poisoned by H. nidulans, polyporic acid is thought to be the primary toxin in H. nidulans.

Polyporic acid has some antifungal and antibacterial activity. It has been shown to be an intermediate in the biosynthesis of allantofuranone, a gamma-lactone antibiotic from the fungus Allantophomopsis lycopodina.

References

1,4-Benzoquinones
Phenyl compounds
Hydroxybenzoquinones
Mycotoxins found in Basidiomycota
Neurotoxins